Krasny Luch is a rural locality (a selo) in Innokentyevsky Selsoviet of Arkharinsky District, Amur Oblast, Russia. The population was 34 as of 2018. There are 2 streets.

Geography 
Krasny Luch is located near the left bank of the Amur River, 44 km southwest of Arkhara (the district's administrative centre) by road. Innokentyevka is the nearest rural locality.

References 

Rural localities in Arkharinsky District